The A6105 road is an A road in the Scottish Borders, Scotland and Northumberland, England. It runs from the village of Earlston to Berwick on Tweed going via Greenlaw and Duns through the Scottish Borders and entering into England, just east of the village of Foulden. The route is single carriageway for its entire length.

Settlements on the route 
 Earlston
 Gordon
 Greenlaw
 Duns
 Chirnside
 Foulden
 Berwick on Tweed

References

Bibliography

Roads in Scotland
Roads in Northumberland